ECAM Rennes - Louis de Broglie (formerly École Louis-de-Broglie) a French engineering College created in 1991.
It offers multidisciplinary training in materials, robotics, industrial engineering, computer science, networks and telecommunications, electrical engineering and automation, and in mechanical and energy engineering.

Located in Bruz, close to Rennes, one of the founder of the school is Jean Robieux. The school is a member of the Conférence des Grandes Écoles (CGE).

References

External links
 ECAM Rennes - Louis de Broglie

Engineering universities and colleges in France
ECAM Rennes
Rennes
Educational institutions established in 1991
1991 establishments in France